The Rhein class of ironclad riverine monitors (Flußkanonenboote) were a pair of ships built by the German Imperial Navy in the aftermath of the Franco-Prussian War. The class comprised two ships, Rhein and Mosel; both were built by the AG Weser shipyard in Bremen, in 1872–1874. They were armed with a pair of  bronze cannon in a revolving gun turret. The ships were intended to protect the German border with France in the event of a conflict, but had short service lives, as war did not come. They served briefly in the defenses of Coblenz, starting in 1875, before being withdrawn from service. The two ships were sold for scrap, apparently in December 1884.

Design
In the aftermath of the Franco-Prussian War of 1870–71, the Imperial German Navy decided that it needed to build river gunboats for service on the Rhine and Moselle to defend the German border. This decision came despite the Navy having seen the French Navy's negative experiences with similar gunboats during the war. The German Navy decided that two armored gunboats were necessary, and awarded the contract to AG Weser to design and build the vessels.

Characteristics
Freeboard was  forward and  aft. The ships were designed to partially flood for combat, which would submerge the hull so only the upper casemate and gun turret would be above water. The hulls were constructed with transverse iron frames. The ships had a crew of one officer and twenty-two enlisted men, and both carried a single boat.

The ships were powered by two horizontal 2-cylinder single-expansion steam engines; these drove a pair of 3-bladed screws  on diameter. The engines were placed in a single engine room. Two locomotive boilers with two fireboxes apiece supplied steam to the engines; they were located in a separate boiler room. The ships maneuvered slowly and turned poorly, especially steaming downstream. They did not handle well upstream either, particularly in turning against the current. Handling while the ships were flooded for combat was especially dangerous.

The ships were each armed with a pair of  L/19 bronze cannon manufactured by Krupp; they were rifled, muzzle-loading guns, mounted in a single revolving gun turret placed on an armored casemate amidships. The guns fired a 36-pound shot, and were supplied with 300 rounds of ammunition. The ships were protected with a combination of wrought iron armor and teak. The casemate was protected with 65 mm of armor plate on the sides.

Service history
The intention for Rhein and Mosel was to use them to defend the railway bridges on the Rhine in the event of a French war of revenge after the Franco-Prussian War in 1870–1871. The ships were both built at the AG Weser dockyard in Bremen, under construction numbers 23 and 24, respectively. The Rhine Railway Company was compelled to contribute 300,000 Thalers to the construction of the ships, as they were intended to defend the railway bridges the company used at Rheinhausen. Both ships were laid down in 1872 and launched later that year; they were both commissioned into the Imperial Navy on 25 April 1874. They spent the first year of their career at Rheinhausen, and in April 1875 both vessels embarked on a test cruise to Strassburg. On 7 April, when they were transferred to the defenses of Coblenz.

By the time the two monitors entered service, the prospect of a French attack had decreased, prompting the Navy to question the usefulness of retaining the vessels. As a result, they were quickly removed from service. The ultimate fate of the two ships is unclear; according to naval historian Erich Gröner, both ships were sold for 3,500 gold marks in December 1875. Robert Gardiner, however, states that the ships remained, out of service, until 1884, when they were sold for scrapping. The latter version would appear to be correct, as J.F. von Kronenfels published an elevation and deck plan of Rhein in 1881, with the inference that Rhein and Mosel were still extant at that time.

Notes

References
 
 
 
 
 
 

Ironclad warships of the Imperial German Navy
Ships built in Bremen (state)
Riverine warfare